Epping may refer to:

Places

Australia
 Epping, New South Wales, a suburb of Sydney
 Epping railway station, Sydney
 Electoral district of Epping, the corresponding seat in the New South Wales Legislative Assembly
 Epping Forest, Kearns, a heritage-listed former farm and residence in Kearns, NSW 
 Epping, Victoria, a suburb of Melbourne
 Epping railway line, the name before 2012 of the Mernda railway line
 Epping railway station, Melbourne
 Epping Forest National Park, Queensland

France 
 Epping, Moselle, a commune

South Africa
 Epping, Cape Town, an industrial area

United States
 Epping, New Hampshire, a New England town
 Epping (CDP), New Hampshire, the main village in the town
 Epping, North Dakota

United Kingdom
 Epping, Essex, England
 Epping (UK Parliament constituency), extant 1885 to 1974
 Epping Forest
 Epping tube station, terminus of the Central Line

People
 John Epping (born 1983), Canadian curler
 Joseph Epping (1835-1894), German Jesuit astronomer and Assyriologist
 Randy Charles Epping, American author
 Rick Epping, American musician

See also
 Epping Forest (disambiguation)
 Epping station (disambiguation)